Henri, Duc de Joyeuse (Toulouse, 21 September 1563 – Rivoli, 28 September 1608) was a General in the French Wars of Religion and a member of the Catholic League, who became ordained as a Capuchin after the death of his wife, Catherine de La Valette. He was the youngest brother of Anne de Joyeuse and François de Joyeuse.

After another of his brothers, Scipion, drowned himself in the Tarn after the defeat of Villemur in 1592, his title of Duke of Joyeuse was passed to Henri. When he died in 1608, the title passed to Henri's daughter Henriette, who had married Henri de Montpensier in 1597.

References

French generals
1563 births
1608 deaths
Henri
Capuchins